Proeulia gielisi is a species of moth of the family Tortricidae. It is found in Santiago Province, Chile.

The wingspan is 25 mm. The ground colour of the forewings is yellowish cream with ochreous admixture and more orange suffusions in the dorsal and terminal parts of the wing. The hindwings are whitish cream.

Etymology
The species is named in honour of Cees Gielis.

References

Moths described in 2010
Proeulia
Moths of South America
Taxa named by Józef Razowski
Endemic fauna of Chile